Dodonaea microzyga, commonly known as brilliant hopbush, is a dioecious spreading shrub in the family Sapindaceae. It grows between 0.3 and 1.5 metres tall.

Flowering occurs in the months May to July. Flowers are red, solitary or paired, generally with 8 stamen, pubescent ovary and 4 sepals. Flowers develop into a 3-winged glabrous capsule. The fruit capsule is also red and membranous with a septifragal dehiscence, referring to the wings of the capsule breaking open to release seeds. The capsule is elliptical in shape, 10–13 mm long, 10–17 mm wide, with the wings between 2.5-5 mm wide.

Two varieties are recognised:
D. microzyga var. acrolobata J.G.West (Western Australia) – imparipinnate leaves between 0.6 and 1.2 cm long with 3 or 4 pairs (sometimes 5) of lateral leaflets ranging in length 3.5–8mm, with the terminal lobe-like leaflet shorter than the laterals. Leaves are rarely entire and infrequently toothed or notched.
D. microzyga F.Muell. var. microzyga – leaves imparipinnate between 0.3 and 0.9 cm long with 2 or 3 pairs of lateral leaflets generally 1.6-3.5mm long. Leaves are entire and rounded or obtuse.

Taxonomy 
The species was first formally described by Victorian Government Botanist Ferdinand von Mueller in 1863 based on plant material collected in the vicinity of Neales River in South Australia during an expedition of John McDouall Stuart.

The genus takes its name from the sixteenth century Flemish physician and botanist Rembert Dodoens, who published an illustrated Flemish flora in his Cruydeboek (1554), which was the first to group plants based on shared physical characteristics rather than the established methodology of alphabetical listing.

Distribution and Occurrence 
Although located in separate areas of Australia, both varieties are located in semi-arid to arid habitats, usually in open woodland or shrubland communities, with D. microzyga F.Muell. var. microzyga preferring stony rises, hills and ranges of ironstone and granite. Widely distributed across South Australia, and extending into southern Northern Territory, western Queensland and far northwestern New South Wales, where it currently has Endangered status. Dodonaea microzyga F.Muell. var. acrolobata is located exclusively in Western Australia, yet is widely distributed in the area between the Murchison region to the north, the Goldfield-Esperance region to the south and east towards the border region of the Great Victoria Desert.

Conservation Status 
New South Wales is the only State government jurisdiction in Australia with a conservation status applied to D. microzyga F.Muell. var. microzyga which is listed as Endangered. The causes for species decline are attributed to restricted habitat, land clearance and feral goats. Feral goats specifically have been listed by the NSW Scientific Committee as a key threatening process to habitat degradation. 

New South Wales has the largest population of feral goats in Australia, preferring the semi-arid rocky rangeland habitats shared with D. microzyga, being more secure from predators and human disturbance than the treeless plains. Dodonaea species (also including D. viscosa and D.attenuata) are palatable to both sheep and goats and are a known forage plant for goats in other states including Western Australia. Although sheep were found not to excessively remove leaf biomass from the plant, feral goats completely defoliate the shrubs resulting in the plants dying.

See also 
List of Dodonaea species.

References

External links

microzyga
Flora of New South Wales
Flora of the Northern Territory
Flora of Queensland
Flora of South Australia
Rosids of Western Australia
Sapindales of Australia
Taxa named by Ferdinand von Mueller